Astrum is a photographic supplies company located in Ukraine and established in 1995. It operates equipment once used by Svema to produce similar product lines.

Products

Black and White Film 

 ФН-64 (FN-64), ISO 64/19°
 Фoto-100 (Foto-100), ISO 100/21°
 Фoto-200 (Foto-200), ISO 200/24°
 Фoto-400 (Foto-400), ISO 400/27°
 МЗ-3 (MZ-3), ISO 3/6°
 А-2Ш (A-2SH), ISO 400/27°
 НК-2Ш (NK-2), ISO 100/21°

Colour Film 

 Color Negative Film，ISO 125/22°
 Color Infrared Film

See also
Svema
Tasma

Photography companies of Ukraine
Companies established in 1995